The 1921–22 Swiss National Ice Hockey Championship was the 12th edition of the national ice hockey championship in Switzerland. EHC St. Moritz won the championship by defeating HC Rosey Gstaad in the final.

First round

Eastern Series

Western Series

First round 
 Genève-Servette HC - HC La Chaux de Fonds 7:1
 HC Genève - Club des Patineurs Lausanne 7:5

Semifinals 
 HC Château-d'Oex - Genève-Servette HC 8:0
 HC Rosey Gstaad - HC Genève 15:0

Final 
 HC Château-d'Oex - HC Rosey Gstaad 3:1

Final 
 EHC St. Moritz - HC Rosey Gstaad 8:2

External links 
Swiss Ice Hockey Federation – All-time results

National
Swiss National Ice Hockey Championship seasons